The Wigner D-matrix is a unitary matrix in an irreducible representation of the groups SU(2) and SO(3). It was introduced in 1927 by Eugene Wigner, and plays a fundamental role in the quantum mechanical theory of angular momentum. The complex conjugate of the D-matrix is an eigenfunction of the Hamiltonian of spherical and symmetric rigid rotors. The letter  stands for Darstellung, which means "representation" in German.

Definition of the Wigner D-matrix 
Let  be generators of the Lie algebra of SU(2) and SO(3). In quantum mechanics, these three operators are the components of a vector operator known as angular momentum. Examples are the angular momentum of an electron in an atom, electronic spin, and the angular momentum of a rigid rotor.

In all cases, the three operators satisfy the following commutation relations,

where i is the purely imaginary number and Planck's constant  has been set equal to one. The Casimir operator

 
commutes with all generators of the Lie algebra.

This defines the spherical basis used here.  That is, there is a complete set of kets (i.e. orthonormal basis of joint eigenvectors labelled by quantum numbers that define the eigenvalues) with

where j = 0, 1/2, 1, 3/2, 2, ... for SU(2), and j = 0, 1, 2, ... for SO(3). In both cases, .

A 3-dimensional rotation operator can be written as

where α, β, γ are Euler angles (characterized by the keywords: z-y-z convention, right-handed frame, right-hand screw rule, active interpretation).

The Wigner D-matrix is a unitary square matrix of dimension 2j + 1 in this spherical basis with elements

where
 
is an element of the orthogonal Wigner's (small) d-matrix.

That is, in this basis, 

is diagonal, like the γ matrix factor, but unlike the above β factor.

Wigner (small) d-matrix 
Wigner gave the following expression:

The sum over s is over such values that the factorials are nonnegative, i.e. , .

Note: The d-matrix elements defined here are real. In the often-used z-x-z convention of Euler angles, the factor  in this formula is replaced by  causing half of the functions to be purely imaginary. The realness of the d-matrix elements is one of the reasons that the z-y-z convention, used in this article, is usually preferred in quantum mechanical applications.

The d-matrix elements are related to Jacobi polynomials  with nonnegative  and  Let

If

Then, with  the relation is

where

Properties of the Wigner D-matrix 
The complex conjugate of the D-matrix satisfies a number of differential properties that can be formulated concisely by introducing the following operators with 

which have quantum mechanical meaning: they are space-fixed rigid rotor angular momentum operators.

Further,

which have quantum mechanical meaning: they are body-fixed rigid rotor angular momentum operators.

The operators satisfy the commutation relations

and the corresponding relations with the indices permuted cyclically. The  satisfy anomalous commutation relations (have a minus sign on the right hand side).
 
The two sets mutually commute,

and the total operators squared are equal,

Their explicit form is,

The operators  act on the first (row) index of the D-matrix,

The operators  act on the second (column) index of the D-matrix,

and,  because of the anomalous commutation relation the raising/lowering operators are defined with reversed signs,

Finally,

An important property of the Wigner D-matrix follows from the commutation of 
 with the time reversal operator 
,

or
 

A further symmetry implies

Orthogonality relations 
The Wigner D-matrix elements  form a set of orthogonal functions of the Euler angles  and :

This is a special case of the Schur orthogonality relations.

Crucially, by the Peter–Weyl theorem, they further form a complete set.

The fact that  are matrix elements of a unitary transformation from one spherical basis   to another  is represented by the relations:

The group characters for SU(2) only depend on  the rotation angle β, being class functions, so, then,  independent of the axes of rotation,

and consequently satisfy simpler orthogonality relations, through the Haar measure of the group,

The completeness relation (worked out in the same reference, (3.95)) is

whence, for

Kronecker product of Wigner D-matrices, Clebsch-Gordan series 
The set of Kronecker product matrices

forms a reducible matrix representation of the groups SO(3) and SU(2). Reduction into irreducible components is by the following equation:

The symbol  is a Clebsch–Gordan coefficient.

Relation to spherical harmonics and Legendre polynomials 
to spherical harmonics and associated Legendre polynomials, normalized to unity and with Condon and Shortley phase convention:

This implies the following relationship for the d-matrix:

A rotation of spherical harmonics  then is effectively a composition of two rotations, 

When both indices are set to zero, the Wigner D-matrix elements are given by ordinary Legendre polynomials:

In the present convention of Euler angles,  is 
in the physical definition of such angles). This is one of the reasons that the z-y-z
convention is used frequently in molecular physics.
From the time-reversal property of the Wigner D-matrix follows immediately

There exists a more general relationship to the spin-weighted spherical harmonics:

Connection with transition probability under rotations 
The absolute square of an element of the D-matrix,

gives the probability that a system with spin  prepared in a state with spin projection  along
some direction will be measured to have a spin projection  along a second direction at an angle 
to the first direction. The set of quantities  itself forms a real symmetric matrix, that
depends only on the Euler angle , as indicated.

Remarkably, the eigenvalue problem for the  matrix can be solved completely:

Here, the eigenvector, is a scaled and shifted discrete Chebyshev polynomial, and the corresponding eigenvalue, is the Legendre polynomial.

Relation to Bessel functions 
In the limit when  we have

List of d-matrix elements 
Using sign convention of Wigner, et al. the d-matrix elements 
for j = 1/2, 1, 3/2, and 2 are given below.

for j = 1/2

for j = 1

for j = 3/2

for j = 2

Wigner d-matrix elements with swapped lower indices are found with the relation:

Symmetries and special cases

See also 
 Clebsch–Gordan coefficients
 Tensor operator
 Symmetries in quantum mechanics

References

External links
 

Representation theory of Lie groups
Matrices
Special hypergeometric functions
Rotational symmetry